Privalov (from привал meaning halt) is a Russian masculine surname, its feminine counterpart is Privalova. Notable people with the surname include:
  
Aleksandr Privalov (1933–2021), Soviet biathlete
Aleksandra Privalova (born 1987), Belarusian table tennis player
Irina Privalova (born 1968), Russian sprinter
Ivan Privalov (1891–1941), Russian mathematician
Ivan Privalov (footballer) (1902–1974), Ukrainian football player

In fiction
 Sergey Privalov, character in the two-part feature film Privalov's Millions
 Aleksandr Ivanovich Privalov, character in the science fiction novel Monday Begins on Saturday

Russian-language surnames